Samuel Ringgold (January 15, 1770 – October 18, 1829), a Democratic-Republican, he served in the U.S. House of Representatives from 1810 to 1821 with the exception of one two-year absence, was a brigadier general in the Maryland militia during the War of 1812 and father of two sons with distinguished military careers, Samuel and Cadwalader.

Life and career
Born in Chestertown, Maryland, Ringgold received limited schooling, then moved to Washington County, Maryland, where he farmed and served on the vestry of Saint John's Church at Hagerstown, Maryland.  By the time he was 25 he was elected to the Maryland House of Delegates (1795) and later served in the Maryland State Senate (1801–1806).

He was a member of the U.S. House of Representatives, representing the fourth district of Maryland from October 15, 1810, to March 3, 1815.  Ringgold's military career included serving during the War of 1812, and serving as a brigadier general in the Maryland militia. He was again elected to the House of Representatives and served from March 4, 1817 to March 3, 1821.

His first wife, Maria, was the daughter of Gen. John Cadwalader, who served in the Continental Army in the Revolutionary War. She died in 1811. Two years later, Samuel Ringgold married Marie Antoinette Hay, the mother of five of Ringgold's 11 children. Marie Antoinette Hay was the daughter of George Hay, U.S Attorney for the District of Virginia, who represented the Government in prosecuting Aaron Burr for treason. George Hay's second wife was Eliza Kortright Monroe, a daughter of President Monroe, and was step-mother to Marie Antoinette Hay. After Samuel Ringold's death Marie married a Robert Mackey Tidball.

After he left Congress, Ringgold returned to his estate, Fountain Rock, which hosted the Chapel in the Woods and now is the site of Saint James School. Founded in 1842, Saint James is one of the oldest Episcopal boarding schools in the United States. He died in Frederick, Maryland, and is buried in Fountain Rock Cemetery, near Hagerstown, Maryland.

Ringgold's children
Ringgold had three sons who served in the military and a daughter who married an army general. The most distinguished of his sons was Samuel (1796–1846) was an officer in the U.S. Army during the Mexican-American War. Also distinguished was  Cadwalader Ringgold (1802–1867), a naval officer who served in the United States Exploring Expedition in command of The Porpoise and later headed another expedition to the Pacific Northwest. He saw service in the Civil War before retiring as a rear admiral. 

The stepson, George Hay Ringgold (1814–1864) was graduated at the United States Military Academy in 1833, later left the Army to become a farmer but rejoined in 1846. He was in charge of the paymasters of the Department of the Pacific from 1861 till his death in San Francisco, California. George Hay Ringgold was buried at Calvary Cemetery, now part of Cypress Lawn in San Mateo County, California. He was an accomplished scholar, draughtsman, and painter.

A daughter, the "beautiful and accomplished" Marie Antoinette Ringgold (daughter of the second wife and named after her), married the prominent Gen. Henry Morris Naglee in San Francisco on May 26, 1865, after her brother's death.

Family tree

References

External links

Biography of (son) Samuel Ringgold (Mexican War officer)
History of the Federal Judiciary

1770 births
1829 deaths
Maryland state senators
Members of the Maryland House of Delegates
American militia generals
Democratic-Republican Party members of the United States House of Representatives from Maryland